Travelers of a Hundred Ages is a nonfiction work on the literary form of Japanese diaries by Donald Keene, who writes in his Introduction that he was introduced to Japanese diaries during his work as a translator for the United States in World War II when he was assigned to translate captured diaries of soldiers; he found them moving enough that he continued to study that genre.  Keene's book takes the form of self-contained long chapters (originally published as independent essays in Japanese in Asahi Shimbun) that deal with a single diary, each of which is valuable in its own right as a literary work  This treatment is especially apparent when Keene writes of Matsuo Bashō's travel diaries, such as The Narrow Road to the North, or provides a window into an author's life, such as in the case of Fujiwara no Teika's Meigetsuki ("Chronicle of the Clear Moon").

There are variant versions of Travelers of a Hundred Ages; the original English version published by Henry Holt deals with diaries between the 850s CE and up to c. 1850, while the Japanese version has a continuation that brings the time span up to c. 1925, in addition to certain chapters that were omitted from the Holt edition "because it seemed unlikely that they would interest readers outside Japan". An expanded edition was later published by Columbia University Press in 1999. 

Thematically, the essays are grouped by historical period. Names are given Japanese-style, family name first.

Contents

"Heian Diaries"
The Record of a Pilgrimage to China in Search of the Buddhist Law, by Ennin
The Tosa Diary, by Ki no Tsurayuki
The Gossamer Years, by "the mother of Michitsuna" or Michitsuna no Haha
The Master of the Hut, by Zōki (増基)
The Izumi Shikibu Diary, by Izumi Shikibu
The Murasaki Shikibu Diary, by Murasaki Shikibu
The Sarashina Diary, by the daughter of Takasue
The Tale of the Tonomine Captain or the Takamitsu Diary, by Fujiwara no Takamitsu
The Collection of the Mother of Jojin, the Ajari, by ?
The Sanuki no Suke Diary, by Fujiwara no Nagako
Chuyuki, by Fujiwara no MunetadaPoetry Collections and Poem Tales, by Shijonomiya no ShimotsukeThe Poetic Memoirs of Lady Daibu, by Lady Daibu

Diaries of the Kamakura PeriodChronicle of the Bright Moon, by Fujiwara no TeikaThe Diary of Minamoto Ienaga, by Minamoto IenagaThe Visit of the Emperor Takakura to Itsukushima, by Minamoto no MichichikaThe Ascension to Heaven of the Late Emperor Takakura, by Minamoto no MichichikaJourney Along the Seacoast Road, by anonymousThe Diary of the Priest Shunjo, by ShunjoA Journey East of the BarrierFitful Slumbers, by AbutsuThe Diary of the Waning Moon, by AbutsuThe Diary of Asukai Masaari, by Asukai MasaariThe Diary of Lady Ben, by Ben no NaishiDiary of Lady Nakatsukasa, by Nakatsukasa no NaishiThe Confessions of Lady Nijō, by Koga NijōAccount of the Takemuki Palace, by Hino Nako

Diaries of the Muromachi PeriodAccount of a Pilgrimage to the Great Shrine of Ise, by Saka JubutsuGifts from the Capital, by SokyuReciting Poetry to Myself at Ojima, by Nijō YoshimotoPilgrimage to Sumiyoshi, by Ashikaga YoshiakiraThe Visit to Itsukushima of the Lord of the Deer Park, by Imagawa RyoshunA Source of Consolation, by ShōtetsuJourney to Fuji, by Asukai MasayoJourney to Zenko-ji, by GyoeAccount of Fujikawa, by Ichijō KaneyoshiJourney to Shirakawa, by SōgiJourney Along the Tsukushi Road, by SōgiAccount of Sogi's Last hours, by SochoAccount of Utsunoyama, by SochoSocho's Notebook, by SochoA Pilgrimage to Yoshino, by Sanjonishi Kin'edaJourney to See Fuji, by Satomura JohaThe Diary of Gen'yo, by Gen'yoChoshoshi's Journey to Kyushu, by Kinoshira Choshoshi

Diaries of the Early Tokugawa PeriodA Record of Favors Received, by Matsunaga TeitokuA Journey of 1616, by Hayashi RazanTravels Round the East, by AnonymousA Journey in the Year 1667, by Ikeda Tsunamasa

Bashō's DiariesExposed in the FieldsA Pilgrimage to KashimaManuscript in My KnapsackJourney to SarashinaThe Narrow Road of OkuThe Saga DiaryDiaries of the Later Tokugawa PeriodJourney to the Northwest, by Kaibara EkkenTravels of Gentlemen Emissaries, by Ogyū SoraiThe Frolic of the Butterfly, by Yamazaki HokkaDiary of the Nagasaki Border Guard, by Nagakubo SekisuiDiary of Kokan's Trip to the West, by Shiba KōkanJournal of a New Era, by Ōta NanpoBakin's Diaries, by Takizawa BakinThe Diary of Iseki Takako, by Iseki TakakoThe Uraga Diary, by Sakuma ShōzanThe Nagasaki Diary, by Kawaji ToshiakiraThe Shimoda Diary'', by Kawaji Toshiakira

References

Japanese books
Books about Japan
1989 non-fiction books
Henry Holt and Company books